John Ashby may refer to:

 John Ashby (Royal Navy officer) (1646–1693), admiral
 John Ashby (militiaman), colonel in the Virginia Militia
 John F. Ashby (1929–2001), bishop of the Episcopal Diocese of Western Kansas